The Secret Life of... is the debut studio album by Australian pop rock band the Veronicas, released on 17 October 2005 on Sire Records. A special limited edition DVD was released with the US version. This edition included two extra songs and videos, and was only available online. It reached number 2 in Australia and is certified 4x platinum. The album spent over a year in the ARIA Albums Chart, without leaving the top 40. The album also reached number 5 in New Zealand and number 3 in the Billboard Top Heatseekers. The Secret Life of... has sold around 50,000 copies in the USA. In early 2007, the album was released worldwide to countries in Asia and in the UK. Positive reception of singles has already been successful in parts of Europe and Asia.

The first single to be released off the album, "4ever", received much radio play in Australia and America. It reached number 2 on the ARIA Singles Chart, also reaching number 20 on the U.S. Hot Dance Club Play chart and number 90 on the U.S. Billboard Pop 100. The song "Secret" is featured on Dance! Online, a multiplayer online casual rhythm game.

In September 2006, the Veronicas were nominated for 3 ARIA Awards for The Secret Life of..., including Best Pop Release, Highest Selling Album and Breakthrough Artist Album. On 29 October, at the ARIA Awards, The Secret Life of... won Best Pop Release. They lost Breakthrough Artist Album to Wolfmother and Highest Selling Album to Human Nature.

Critical reception

The album received generally positive reviews. Stephen Thomas Erlewine from AllMusic stated "[...] it's a terrific little pop record [...] an unexpected gift, a slick, tuneful set of pure sugarcoated fun. Here, melody runs through both the verses and choruses, the hooks dig deeper, not just on the tracks helmed by Martin, but on the Orgliasso sisters' songs, too." Laura Sinagra from Blender complimented their songs "4ever", which she said sounded like "[...] a remix of Kelly Clarkson's "Since U Been Gone" [...]"  and "When It All Falls Apart"  which has "[...] the marching, singalong wistfulness of great late-'80s arena pop." But she called the ballads "[...] copious [and] dull[...]" but complimented their cover of Tracy Bonham's hit Mother Mother. E! Online gave the album a C grade complementing "4ever" as "[...] an endearing pop take on the Donnas' slutty garage rock." But then said the album "[...] feels like it was designed by committee, with each track sounding like a second generation Xerox of the token girlie rocker hit on the last five Now! compilations[...]" Christian Hoard from Rolling Stone said that "4ever" was the only exceptional song on the album while the rest of it "[...] is overrun with bland, airbrushed introspection like "Mother Mother" and "Nobody Wins." Slant Magazine called the album "[...] so damned slick and irresistible[...] There's a punky sassiness to most of the album[...]" Dan Raper of PopMatters compared their style of music to those of Avril Lavigne and Kelly Clarkson. He complimented their songs "Revolution", "Leave Me Alone", "Mouth Shut" and "Heavily Broken" stating that "[...]half the songs on the record fall into this mould of attractively packaged, unremarkable pop." Craig Mathieson of The Age gave positive reviews for "4ever" and "Revolution" but criticised the rest of the album. The New York Times said the album had "Sugar-sharp songs with a hint of intrigue[...]", and Entertainment Weekly also complimented them stating "Guilty pleasure or not, these girls won't be a Secret for long."

Chart performance
In Australia, The Secret Life of... made its debut at number seven on the ARIA Top 50 Albums Chart on the issue dated 30 October 2005. After dropping and rising on the charts for up to six months the album eventually went on to peak at number two where it stayed for two weeks. By the end of 2005 the album was certified platinum and by 2006 it was made a further four times platinum with a shipment of 280,000 copies.
In New Zealand, the album made its debut and peaked at number five in 2006. The album was certified gold by the Recording Industry Association of New Zealand for shipments of 7,500 copies.

It made its debut and peaked at number one hundred and thirty-three in the U.S. on the Billboard 200 chart. It spent only two weeks on the chart with sales of 14,556 copies. It also peaked at number three on the Billboard Top Heatseekers chart where it spent ten weeks.

In Europe, the album peaked at number eleven on the Ultratop 50 albums chart in Belgium. The album spent a total of nineteen non-consecutive weeks on the chart. In the rest of Europe it peaked at number seventy-five on the Dutch MegaCharts and at number sixty-one on the Switzerland album charts.

Singles
"4ever" was released as the album's lead single on 15 August 2005. The single was successful in Australia peaking at number two and peaking at number seven in New Zealand. In Europe it became a top 40 hit in Austria, Belgium, Germany, Italy and Switzerland and in the United States it peaked at number twelve on the Bubbling Under Hot 100 Singles chart. "Everything I'm Not" was released as the second single in Australia and New Zealand. It peaked at number seven in Australia and number ten in New Zealand. It also peaked at number three on the Ultratip charts in Belgium. "When It All Falls Apart" was the third single in Australia, New Zealand and Europe and their second single in the United States. It peaked at number seven in Australia and New Zealand, becoming their third consecutive top ten hit from the album in both countries. In Belgium it peaked at number 18 and 83 on the Dutch Charts. "Revolution" was released as the fourth single from the album in Australia. It was released on 7 August 2006 and it peaked at number eighteen. "Leave Me Alone" was the final single to be released from their album. It peaked at number forty-one in Australia and was on the top-fifty chart for only two weeks.

Promotion

The Veronicas made several appearances around the world to promote their album. They performed live on  Dancing with the Stars, Rove Live, Sunrise and Total Request Live in Italy and Australia. On 2 October 2005 they performed 4ever live at the 2005 NRL Grand Final during the pre-match show. They also performed live at the 2006 ARIA Music Awards, the 2006 MTV Australia Video Music Awards and the 2006 Belgium TMF Awards.

The Veronicas also sung the theme song for The WB TV series "Related" where their songs were regularly featured as well making an appearance in the episode "Daddy's Little Girl" where they performed "Heavily Broken". They also appeared in an episode of the ABC Family series Beautiful People entitled "Where are We Now?" where they performed "Revolution". Their song "4ever" was featured in the 2006 movie She's the Man.

The album received further promotion when they embarked on their first US tour which went from 28 January 2006 to 3 March 2006. They then embarked on their first Australian tour in April 2006 where all their shows were sold out. And finally in August 2006 they embarked on the "Revolution Tour" in Australia which marked one year since the release of "4ever". They also supported Ryan Cabrera on a tour of the US and were also meant to tour with Ashlee Simpson during her 2006 U.S. summer tour but had to pull out after Lisa became ill with throat nodules and needed surgery.

Track listing

Personnel

Jeff Aldrich - A&R
Josh Alexander - production, recording, synthesizers, keyboards, acoustic guitars, drum programming, electric guitar
Randy Cooke - drums
William Derella - management
Toby Gad - production, mixing, recording, guitar, keyboard, programming
Jens Gad - drums
Brian "Big Boss" Gardner - mixing
Serban Ghenea - mixing
Don Gilmore - production, mixing
Michael Goldstone - A&R
Dr. Luke - production, instruments
John Hanes - engineering
Nick Haussling - A&R Coordinator
Rob Jacobs - recording
Chantal Kreviazuk - production, arrangement, keyboards
Abe Laboriel Jr - drums
Jason Lader - engineering
Clif Magness - production, engineering, mixing, acoustic & electric guitar, piano, keyboards, bass guitar and programming

Raine Maida - production, engineering, arrangement, digital editing, guitar, bass, keyboards, programming
Max Martin - production, instruments
Gerogina McAvenna - management, album coordination
Kieron Menzies - additional recording
Dead Mono - production, mixing
Jessica Origliasso - lead vocals, background vocals, writer, main artist 
Lisa Origiliasso - lead vocals, background vocals, writer, main artist
Tim Pierce - electric guitar
Chris Reynolds - engineer
David Sonenberg - management
Andrew Southam - photography
Billy Steinberg - production
Mark "Spike" Stent - mixing
Greg Wells - production, drums, guitar, bass, piano
Steven Wolf - drums
Rami Yacoub - production, instruments
Joe Zook - recording, mixing

Chart and certifications

Weekly charts

Decade-end chart

Certifications

Release history

References

External links
More information from Warner Music Australia.
Amazon.com about the album.
Listen to samples of the album.

2005 debut albums
The Veronicas albums
Albums produced by Billy Steinberg
Albums produced by Dr. Luke
Albums produced by Greg Wells
Albums produced by Max Martin
Albums produced by Raine Maida
Albums produced by Rami Yacoub
Albums produced by Toby Gad
ARIA Award-winning albums
London Records albums
Sire Records albums